NILFS or NILFS2 (New Implementation of a Log-structured File System) is a log-structured file system implementation for the Linux kernel. It was developed by Nippon Telegraph and Telephone Corporation (NTT) CyberSpace Laboratories and a community from all over the world. NILFS was released under the terms of the GNU General Public License (GPL).

Design
"NILFS is a log-structured file system, in that the storage medium is treated like a circular buffer and new blocks are always written to the end.[…]Log-structured file systems are often used for flash media since they will naturally perform wear-leveling;[…]NILFS emphasizes snapshots. The log-structured approach is a specific form of copy-on-write behavior, so it naturally lends itself to the creation of file system snapshots. The NILFS developers talk about the creation of "continuous snapshots" which can be used to recover from user-initiated file system problems[…]."

Using a copy-on-write technique known as "nothing in life is free", NILFS records all data in a continuous log-like format that is only appended to, never overwritten, an approach that is designed to reduce seek times, as well as minimize the kind of data loss that occurs after a crash with conventional file systems. For example, data loss occurs on ext3 file systems when the system crashes during a write operation. When the system reboots, the journal notes that the write did not complete, and any partial data writes are lost.

Some file systems, like UFS-derived file systems used by the Solaris operating system and BSDs, provide a snapshot feature that prevents such data loss, but the snapshot configuration can be lengthy on large file systems. NILFS, in contrast, can "continuously and automatically [save] instantaneous states of the file system without interrupting service", according to NTT Labs.

The "instantaneous states" that NILFS continuously saves can actually be mounted, read-only, at the same time that the actual file system is mounted read-write — a capability useful for data recovery after hardware failures and other system crashes. The "lscp" (list checkpoint) command of an interactive NILFS "inspect" utility is first used to find the checkpoint's address, in this case "2048":

 # inspect /dev/sda2
 ...
 nilfs> listcp
    1     6 Tue Jul 12 14:55:57 2005 MajorCP|LogiBegin|LogiEnd
 2048  2352 Tue Jul 12 14:55:58 2005 MajorCP|LogiEnd
 ...
 nilfs> quit

The checkpoint address is then used to mount the checkpoint:

 # mount -t nilfs -r -o cp=2048 /dev/sda2 /nilfs-cp
 # df
 Filesystem           1K-blocks      Used Available Use% Mounted on
 /dev/sda2             70332412   8044540  62283776  12% /nilfs
 /dev/sda2             70332412   8044540  62283776  12% /nilfs-cp

Features
NILFS provides continuous snapshotting. In addition to versioning capability of the entire file system, users can even restore files mistakenly overwritten or deleted at any recent time. Since NILFS can keep consistency like conventional LFS, it achieves quick recovery after system crashes.

Continuous snapshotting is not provided by most file systems, including those supporting point-in-time snapshotting (e.g. Btrfs)

NILFS creates a number of checkpoints every few seconds or per synchronous write basis (unless there is no change). Users can select significant versions among continuously created checkpoints, and can change them into snapshots which will be preserved until they are changed back to checkpoints.

There is no limit on the number of snapshots until the volume gets full. Each snapshot is mountable as a read-only file system. It is mountable concurrently with a writable mount and other snapshots, and this feature is convenient to make consistent backups during use.

Possible uses of NILFS include versioning, tamper detection, SOX compliance logging, data loss recovery.

The current major version of NILFS is version 2, which is referred to as NILFS2. NILFS2 implements online garbage collection to reclaim disk space with keeping multiple snapshots.

Other NILFS features include:

 B-tree based file and inode management.
 Immediate recovery after system crash.
 64-bit data structures; support many files, large files and disks.
 64-bit on-disk timestamps which are free of the year 2038 problem.

Current status

Issues
As of 2023, NILFS lacks in dedicated consistency checking utility (fsck), thus it can´t recover from severe errors that cause it to fail to find a valid checkpoint.

Supported features
 Basic POSIX file system features
 Snapshots
 Automatically and continuously taken
 No limit on the number of snapshots until the volume gets full
 Mountable as read-only file systems
 Mountable concurrently with the writable mount (convenient to make consistent backups during use)
 Quick listing
 Background Garbage Collection (GC)
 Can maintain multiple snapshots
 Selectable GC Policy, which is given by a userland daemon.
 Quick crash recovery on-mount
 Read-ahead for meta data files as well as data files
 Block sizes smaller than page size (e.g. 1KB or 2KB)
 Online resizing (since Linux-3.x and nilfs-utils 2.1)
 Related utilities (by contribution of Jiro SEKIBA)
 grub2
 util-linux (blkid, libblkid, uuid mount)
 udisks, palimpsest
 File system label (nilfs-tune)

Additional features 
 Fast write and recovery times
 Minimal damage to file data and system consistency on hardware failure
 32-bit checksums (CRC32) on data and metadata for integrity assurance (per block group, in segment summary) 
 Correctly ordered data and meta-data writes
 Redundant superblock
 Internal data is processed in 64-bit wide word size
 Can create and store huge files (8 EiB)

Compatibility 
NILFS is available in various GNU/Linux distributions like Arch Linux, Debian (since version 5.0), Fedora, Gentoo, Linux Mint, NixOS, Ubuntu (since version  9.10), etc. To use it, users typically need to install the nilfs-utils or nilfs-tools package. A boot-cd with NILFS is also available on PrRescue.

It is also supported by partition-editing application like GParted.

A separate, BSD licensed implementation, currently with read-only support, is included in NetBSD.

Relative performance 
In the January 2015 presentation SD cards and file systems for embedded systems at Linux.conf.au, it was stated:

License
The NILFS2 file system utilities are made available under the GNU Public License version 2, with the exception of the lib/nilfs libraries and their header files, which are made available under the GNU Lesser General Public License Version 2.1.

Developers 
The Japanese primary authors and major contributors to the nilfs-utils who worked or are working at labs of NTT Corporation are: 
 Ryusuke Konishi (Primary maintainer, 02/2008–Present)
 Koji Sato
 Naruhiko Kamimura
 Seiji Kihara
 Yoshiji Amagai
 Hisashi Hifumi and
 Satoshi Moriai.
Other major contributors are:
 Andreas Rohner 
 Dan McGee
 David Arendt
 David Smid
 dexen deVries
 Dmitry Smirnov
 Eric Sandeen
 Jiro SEKIBA
 Matteo Frigo
 Hitoshi Mitake
 Takashi Iwai
 Vyacheslav Dubeyko

See also 

ZFS
Btrfs
F2FS, another log-structured file system implementation
List of file systems
Comparison of file systems
Log-structured File System (BSD)
Sprite operating system

References

External links

Manjaro tutorial NILFS: A filesystem designed to minimize the likelyhood [sic] of data loss  

Disk file systems
File systems supported by the Linux kernel
Persistence